This is a list of Colombian telenovelas.
 ¡Ay cosita linda mamá!
 ¿Por qué diablos?
 ¿Por qué mataron a Betty si era tan buena muchacha?  (1991, RTI Producciones)
 ¿Quién amará a María?
 Ángel de la guarda, mi dulce compañía
 Alicia en el País de la Mercancías
 Almas de piedra (1994, TeVecine, Canal Uno)
 Amantes del Desierto
 Amar y vivir (1988–1990, RTI Producciones)
 Amor a Mil
 Amor a la Plancha
 Amor de mis Amores
 Amor en Custodia
 Amores Cruzados
 Amores de Mercado
 Ana de negro (1991, RTI Producciones)
 Azúcar (1989, RCN TV)
 Bella Calamidades
 Bermúdez
 Brujeres
 Código de Pasión
 Cómplices
 Caballo Viejo
 Café, con aroma de mujer (1994, RCN TV)
 Calamar (1989, Caracol Televisión)
 Candela (1994–1995, Caracol Televisión)
 La Caponera
 Cara o Sello, Dos Rostros de Mujer
 Carolina Barrantes
 Cartas de amor (1997, Cenpro TV)
 Castillo de Naipes
 Las Cinco Caras del Amor
 Conjunto Cerrado
 Copas amargas
 Corazón Prohibido
 Crimen y Castigo
 Criminal: El Camino Del Mal
 Cuando quiero llorar no lloro (Los Victorinos) (1990, RTI Producciones)
 La Dama de Troya
 De Pies a Cabeza
 Detrás de un ángel (1993, RTI Producciones)
 Dios se lo pague (1998, Caracol Televisión)
 Divorciada
 Doña Barbara
 Doña Bella
 Don Chinche
 Dora, La Celadora
 Dos mujeres (1997, RTI Producciones)
 Ecomoda
 El Ángel de Piedra
 El 0597 está ocupado
 El Baile de la Vida
 El capo
 El Cartel de los Sapos
 El Cartel 2
 El Círculo
 El Fiscal
 El Inútil
 El Joe, La Leyenda
 El Manantial
 El Nombre del Amor
 El Precio del Silencio
 El manantial (1996, Producciones JES)
 El oasis (1995, Cenpro TV)
 El pasado no perdona (1990–1991, Producciones PUNCH)
 El pasado no perdona 2 (2005, Fox Telecolombia, RCN TV)
 La Elegida
 En Los Tacones De Eva
 En cuerpo ajeno (1992, RTI Producciones, Organización de Televisión Iberoamericana)
 Enigmas del más allá
 Entre Amores
 Escalona (1991, Caracol Televisión)
 Eternamente Manuela (1995, RCN TV)
 Flor de oro (1995–1996, Caracol Televisión)
 Floricienta
Francisco el matématico
 Fuego Verde
 Fuera de Foco
 Gallito Ramírez (1986, Caracol Televisión)
 El Gallo de Oro
 Garzas al amanecer (1988–1990, RCN TV)
 Guajira (1996, RCN TV)
 Hasta que la plata nos separe
 Herencia maldita (1990, RTI Producciones)
 Hermosa Niña
 La Hija del Mariachi
 Hilos Invisibles
 Hilos de amor
 Historias de Hombres solo para Mujeres
 Hombres
 Juan Joyita quiere ser Caballero
 Juego Limpio
 Juegos Prohibidos
 Juliana que mala eres (1997, Caracol Televisión)
 LP loca pasión (1989, RTI Producciones)
 La abuela (1978, RTI Producciones)
 La Baby-sister
 La bella Ceci y el imprudente ("The Beautiful Ceci and the imprudent one")
 La casa de las dos palmas (1991, RCN TV)
 La Ciudad Grita
 La Costeña y El Cachaco
 La Dama del Pantano
 La Diosa Coronada
 La elegida (1997, TeVecine, Caracol Televisión)
 La Ex
 La Guerra de las Rosas
 La Madre
 La mala hora
 La maldición del paraíso (1993, Producciones JES)
 La Marca del Deseo
 La mujer doble (1992, Caracol Televisión)
 La mujer del presidente (1997, Caracol Televisión)
 La mujer en el espejo (1997, Cenpro TV)
 La mujer en el espejo (2004, Caracol Televisión, RTI Producciones)
 La Niña
 La otra mitad del sol (1996, Cenpro TV)
 La otra raya del tigre (1993, RCN TV)
 La Pezuña del Diablo
 La potra zaina (1993, RCN TV)
 La Prepago
 La Quiero a morir
 La Saga, Negocio de Familia
 La Sombra del Arco Iris
 La sombra del deseo (1996, Caracol Televisión)
 La Tormenta
 La Traición
 La Venganza
 La viuda de blanco (1996, RTI Producciones)
 Las aguas mansas (1994, Telemundo, RTI Producciones)
 Las ejecutivas (1995, Caracol Televisión)
 Las juanas (1997, RCN TV)
 Leche
 Loca Pasión
 Lola Calamidades
 Lorena
 Los Cuervos
 Los pecados de Inés de Hinojosa (1988, RTI Producciones)
 Los Perez, somos así
 Los Reyes
 Lucerito (1992, Jorge Barón Televisión)
 Luna, La Heredera
 Luzbel esta de visita
 Música maestro (1990, Caracol Televisión)
 Madre Luna
 Mambo (1994, Producciones JES)
 María (1991, RCN TV)
 María bonita (1995, RTI Producciones)
 María Madrugada
 Marido y Mujer
 Mascarada (1996, Producciones JES)
 Maten al león (1989, RTI Producciones, Telecaribe)
 Me Amaras Bajo La Lluvia
 Me Llaman Lolita
 Merlina, Mujer Divina
 Mesa Para Tres
 Mi pequeña mamá
 Milagros de Amor
 Momposina (1994, RCN TV)
 Nadie es eterno en el mundo
 Niños Ricos, Pobres Padres
 No juegues con mi vida (1989, RTI Producciones)
 No renuncies Salomé
 Nuevo Rico Nuevo Pobre
 O Todos en la Cama
 Otra en mí (1996, TeVecine)
 Pa' Machos
 Pablo Escobar: El Patrón del Mal
 Pasión de gavilanes
 Pasiones secretas (1993, Caracol Televisión)
 Pecado santo (1995, TeVecine)
 Pecados Capitales
 Pedro El Escamoso
 Perfume de agonía (1997, Producciones JES)
 Pero sigo siendo el Rey
 Perro amor (1998–1999, Cenpro TV)
 Pobre Pablo
 Pocholo
 Por Amor
 Prisioneros del amor (1997, Pawell Nowicky, Caracol Televisión)
 Puerto Amor
 Pura Sangre
 Quieta Margarita
 Rauzán
 La Reina de Queens
 Reinas
 Retratos
 La Séptima Puerta
 Sín límites
 Sabor a Limón
 San Tropel
 Sangre de lobo (1992, Producciones JES)
 Sara un grito en el silencio
 Sarabanda
 Señora Isabel (1993, Coestrellas)
 Señora bonita (1991, Jorge Barón Televisión)
 Se armó la Gorda
 Si nos dejan
 Siete veces Amada
 Sin tetas no hay paraíso
 Sobrevivir (1997, Colteve)
 Sofia dame tiempo
 Soledad
 Solo una mujer (1994, Caracol Televisión)
 Solterita y a la Orden
 Sueños y espejos
 Te voy a enseñar a querer
 Tiempos difíciles (1995, Cenpro TV)
 Tiro de gracia (2015, Caracol Televisión, Televisa)
 Todos Quieren con Marilyn
 Traga Maluca
 Tuyo es mi corazón (1985, Caracol Televisión)
 Un Ángel llamado Azul
 Vecinos
 Vendaval (1974, RTI Producciones)
 Victoria
 Vida de mi vida (1994, TeVecine)
 El Vuelo de la Cometa
 Yo Soy Betty, La Fea
 Yo soy Franky
 Yo amo a Paquita Gallego (1997, RTI Producciones)
 Yo no te pido la luna
 Yo y Tú
 Zorro: La Espada y la Rosa

References

External links 
 La Historia de la Televisión en Colombia (interactivo) 
 Historia de la televisión (Biblioteca Luis Ángel Arango) 
 Especial de los 50 años de la televisión en Colombia (El Tiempo) 
 Las 10 mejores comedias clásicas de la televisión colombiana 
 Fechas que marcaron la historia de la televisión en Colombia 

 
Colombian